Czechoslovakia competed at the 1988 Summer Paralympics in Seoul, South Korea. 1 competitor from Czechoslovakia won a single silver medal and finished joint 45th in the medal table along with Thailand.

See also 
 Czechoslovakia at the Paralympics
 Czechoslovakia at the 1988 Summer Olympics

References 

Czechoslovakia at the Paralympics
1988 in Czechoslovak sport
Nations at the 1988 Summer Paralympics